Matt Costello (4 August 1924 – 27 November 1987) was a Scottish footballer, who played as a winger in the Football League for Chesterfield and Chester.

References

Chester City F.C. players
Chesterfield F.C. players
Association football wingers
English Football League players
1924 births
1987 deaths
Scottish footballers
Footballers from Airdrie, North Lanarkshire